Road to Perdition is a series of fictional works written by Max Allan Collins.

The comic book of the original series, with art by Richard Piers Rayner, was published by DC Comics' imprint Paradox Press. It was adapted into the 2002 film of the same name, starring Tom Hanks, for which Collins also wrote the novelization.

Stories
Road to Perdition
Michael O'Sullivan, the ruthless but honorable enforcer for a crime syndicate, is personally betrayed by his masters and is forced to flee with his young son Michael, Jr. on a quest for revenge. The story is set in the American Midwest during the Great Depression and draws upon several historical figures, especially the gangster John Patrick Looney, of Rock Island, Illinois; in real life, Looney came into conflict with Dan Drost, a formerly loyal lieutenant in their crime organization, and their feud eventually led to the death of Looney's son Connor.

This story had many inspirations, such as the Japanese manga series Lone Wolf and Cub, the American gangster John Patrick Looney, and various gangster films such as The Godfather and The St. Valentine's Day Massacre. 

This story was the basis for the 2002 film of the same name.

On the Road to Perdition
This three-part miniseries of graphic novels was written after the original story, but deals with events within the same timeframe. All three parts were published as individual installments, but have also been reprinted as a single combined volume.

Road to Purgatory and Road to Paradise
These two prose sequels deal with the adult life of Michael O'Sullivan, Jr., under his adoptive identity of Michael Satariano. After military service in Bataan during World War II, he returns to the world of organized crime to seek revenge on other gangsters who had been complicit in his father's death.

Collins is expected to write and direct the film adaptation of Road to Purgatory.

Return to Perdition
This graphic novel follows the story of Michael Satariano, Jr., a Vietnam vet who returns home from the war and gets caught up in the criminal underworld of his father and grandfather.

Influences
Series author Collins acknowledged the influence of the Japanese manga Lone Wolf and Cub by  Kazuo Koike and Goseki Kojima on his work with Road to Perdition, saying in an interview to the BBC, "Road To Perdition is 'an unabashed homage' to Lone Wolf And Cub".

Ethan Iverson mentions in his detailed online bibliography for Donald E. Westlake, that Collins adapted some dialogue in the graphic novel (later included in altered form in the film adaptation) from a very similar scene in the Parker novel, Butcher's Moon.

Publications

Graphic novels
 Road to Perdition (by Max Allan Collins, with Richard Piers Rayner 304 pages):
 Pocket Books, June 1998, 
 Titan Books, August 2002, 
 Simon & Schuster, July 2002, 
 Paradox Press, April 2005)<ref>"'Road to Perdition' details". DCComics.com.</ref>
 On the Road to Perdition Book 1: Oasis (with José Luis García-López and Josef Rubinstein), 96 pages.
 Paradox Press, May 2003, 
 Titan Books, June 2003)
 On the Road to Perdition Book 2: Sanctuary (with José Luis García-López and Steve Lieber), 96 pages.
 Paradox Press, December 2003, 
 Titan Books, March 2004)
 On the Road to Perdition Book 3: Detour (with José Luis García-López and Steve Lieber), 96 pages.
 Paradox Press, July 2004, 
 Titan Books, October 2004)
 Road to Perdition: On the Road, 296 pages (single-volume collection of Books 1-3 above).
 Paradox Press, December 2004, 
 Titan Books, May 2005, 
 Return to Perdition (by Max Allan Collins, with Terry Beatty, 192 pages).
 Vertigo (DC Comics), August 2011.

Prose
 Road to Perdition (film novelization), 256 pages, Onyx, June 2002)
 Road to Purgatory (288 pages, by William Murrow, 2004)
 Road to Paradise'' (289 pages, by William Murrow, 2005)

References

External links

Interviews
 
 Max Allan Collins on Perdition’s Sanctuary: SBC Q&A, Comics Bulletin.

Reviews
 Review of Road to Perdition at Comics Bulletin

1998 books
DC Comics graphic novels
American comics adapted into films
Paradox Press titles
DC Comics adapted into films